A drop zone is a place where parachutists or parachuted supplies land.

Drop zone may also refer to:

 Drop Zone (film), a 1994 American action film
 Dropzone, a 1984 scrolling shooter video game
 Drop Zone (G.I. Joe), a fictional character in the G.I. Joe universe
 Drop zone (sports) or relegation zone, in sports with promotion and relegation, teams low enough in the table to be subject to relegation
 "Drop-Zone" (Young Justice), an episode of Young Justice
 Drop Zone: Stunt Tower, now known as Drop Tower: Scream Zone, a type of amusement ride at Cedar Fair amusement and theme parks in North America
 "Drop Zone", a song by Michael Woods
 "Drop Zone", a song by JJ Lawhorn

See also

 
 
 Landing zone (disambiguation)
 Landing pad (disambiguation)
 Drop (disambiguation)
 Zone (disambiguation)
 DZ (disambiguation)